Mutter is a surname. Notable people with the surname include:

 Anne-Sophie Mutter (born 1963), German violinist
 Carol Mutter, U.S. Marine lieutenant general
 Edda Mutter (born 1970), German alpine skier 
 Robert Mutter, American politician
 Scott Mutter, American photographer
 Stefan Mutter, Swiss cyclist
 George Muter, early chief justice of Kentucky